The Penghu Aquarium is a public aquarium in Baisha Township, Penghu County, Taiwan.

History
The aquarium was established in 1997 to enable the Fisheries Research Institute to study local marine ecology.

Architecture
The aquarium covers 2 hectares of land. The main building is surrounded by gardens and sculptures of various types of marine creatures. The building is a two-story building with three main sections, consisting of a seashore exhibition area, a reef exhibition area and an ocean exhibition area. There is also an underwater tunnel with a walkway encased in glass. The main architect for this building, Barney Thorne, engineered the huge fish tank inside which houses a large variety of exotic fish.

Exhibition
The aquariumis home to over two hundred species of fish from water within 800 km radius of Baisha covering Taiwan Strait and South China Sea.

See also
 List of tourist attractions in Taiwan

References

1997 establishments in Taiwan
Amusement parks opened in 1997
Aquaria in Taiwan
Buildings and structures in Penghu County
Tourist attractions in Penghu County